Trygodes is a genus of moths in the family Geometridae.

Description
Palpi slender and reaching just beyond the frons. Antennae of male ciliated. Hindlegs much reduced, tibia dilated with a large tuft of long hair from base and without spurs. Abdomen with lateral tufts of hair towards extremity. Forewings with vein 3 from angle of cell and vein 5 from somewhat above middle of discocellulars. Veins 7, 8, 9 and 10 stalked, and vein 11 anastomosing (fusing) slightly with them to form the areole. Hindwings with vein 3 from angle of cell. Vein 5 from somewhat above middle of discocellulars.

References

Sterrhinae